Marimatha squala is a moth of the family Noctuidae first described by Clifford D. Ferris and J. Donald Lafontaine in 2010. It is found from Arizona, southward to Costa Rica.

Adults are on wing from mid-July to mid-August in Arizona and from late May in Costa Rica.

Etymology
The species name is derived from the shark genus Squalus in reference to the shark fin-like process on the dorsal margin of the male valva.

External links

Noctuinae